Balacra rubrostriata is a moth of the family Erebidae. It was described by Per Olof Christopher Aurivillius in 1898 and is found in Burundi, Cameroon, the Democratic Republic of the Congo, Gabon, Ghana, Kenya, Togo, Uganda and Zambia.

References

Balacra
Moths described in 1898
Erebid moths of Africa